Halkalı station is the westernmost station on the Marmaray line as well as in Istanbul. The station also services regional trains to Edirne, Uzunköprü, Çerkezköy and international trains to Sofia. In summer, there may be through trains to Bucharest too.

Overview
The Halkalı logistics center and the old Halkalı electric train maintenance depot are located near the station. The station is next to Lake Küçükçekmece and services the population in north-central Küçükçekmece.

The terminal is the departure terminal for all freight trains to Europe and is an important container terminal, used by rail container lines IFB, Express Interfracht, Europe Intermodal and Metrans. It is possible that the Marmaray will eventually be extended to Ispartakule, which may cause further construction works and closures in the future.

As Halkalı is now surrounded by residential areas due to the growth of the city, its role as the main customs post for trucks to Europe is due to end, with trucks using the new Muratbey Customs Office (Muratbey Gümrük Müdürlüğü) in Catalca instead. 

A Metro line from Halkalı to the new Istanbul Airport was under construction in 2022.

References 

Railway stations in Istanbul Province
Railway stations opened in 1872
Küçükçekmece
1872 establishments in the Ottoman Empire
High-speed railway stations in Turkey
Rapid transit stations under construction in Turkey